Overland is an Australian literary and cultural magazine, established in 1954 and  published quarterly in print as well as online.

History
Overland was established in 1954, under the auspices of the Realist Writers Group in Melbourne, with Stephen Murray-Smith as the first editor-in-chief. It was initially formed by anti-Stalinist members of the Communist Party of Australia and other members of the 1950s New Left.

Editors
The magazine has been edited by:
 Stephen Murray-Smith, 1954–1988
 Barrett Reid, 1988–1993
 John McLaren, Spring 1993 – Autumn 1997
 Ian Syson, Winter 1997 – Summer 2002
 Nathan Hollier and Katherine Wilson, Autumn 2002 – Spring 2004
 Nathan Hollier, 2005–2006
 Jeff Sparrow, 2007–2014
 Jacinda Woodhead, 2015–2019
 Evelyn Araluen and Jonathan Dunk, since 2019

Description
Overland describes itself as "Australia’s only radical literary magazine", which publishes fiction, poetry, non-fiction and art. It says it "continues to document lesser-known stories and histories [and] give a voice to those whose stories are otherwise marginalised, misrepresented or ignored, and point public debate in alternative directions".

Its formats are a quarterly print journal (which publishes fiction, poetry and essays) and an online magazine containing daily cultural commentary and occasional fiction and poetry. It also "holds events, discussions and debates, hosts a number of major literary competitions, and runs a residency for under-represented writers".

, the editors-in-chief are Evelyn Araluen and Jonathan Dunk, and it is published by a not-for-profit organisation. Its patron is Barry Jones.

Competitions
Judith Wright Poetry Prize for New and Emerging Poets, established in 2007
Neilma Sidney Short Story Prize
Nakata Brophy Short Fiction and Poetry Prize for Young Indigenous Writers (publication in the print magazine, and a writing residency at Trinity College, University of Melbourne
Victoria University Short Story Prize for New Writers
Fair Australia Prize
Overland Kuracca Prize for Australian Literature in honour of Kerry Reed-Gilbert (A$8,000)

See also 
List of literary magazines

References

Further reading

External links 

Magazines established in 1954
Literary magazines published in Australia
Quarterly magazines published in Australia
Magazines published in Melbourne
1954 establishments in Australia